Matt Manfredi is an American screenwriter.

Early life and education
Manfredi is from Palos Verdes, California, the son of Nancy and George Manfredi. His mother is a human resource manager for the Torrance, California city government and his father was a private lawyer in Los Angeles. He graduated from Brown University and also has a master's degree in screenwriting from the American Film Institute in Los Angeles. While in college he joined an improv comedy group where he met his future writing partner Phil Hay. He is of Italian descent.

Filmography

All of his film screenwriting work has been with writing partner Phil Hay. Their technique for joint screenwriting is to each write separate scenes and then trade them to each other for further rewrites.

Personal life
As a widower in 2004, he married his second wife Casey Greenfield, daughter of news correspondent and author Jeff Greenfield. They divorced less than a year later. He has since remarried and has one daughter and one son.

References

Further reading

External links

20th-century births
21st-century American screenwriters
American male screenwriters
Living people
Place of birth missing (living people)
People from Palos Verdes, California
Year of birth missing (living people)
Screenwriters from California
Brown University alumni
AFI Conservatory alumni
American writers of Italian descent
21st-century American male writers